Fernando Cavallini (15 February 1893 – 4 February 1976) was an Italian fencer. He competed in the individual foil and team sabre events at the 1912 Summer Olympics.

References

1893 births
1976 deaths
Italian male fencers
Olympic fencers of Italy
Fencers at the 1912 Summer Olympics
Sportspeople from Livorno